Sacred Falls (27 August 2009 – 1 December 2019) was a champion New Zealand Thoroughbred racehorse and sire.

He was sold at the New Zealand Bloodstock Yearling Sales in 2011 for $160,000.

Racing career
He began his career with Tony Pike and Mark Donoghue where he won his first six starts, including the Hawke's Bay Guineas and New Zealand 2000 Guineas. Following this he was transferred to Chris Waller in Sydney, Australia, where he finished second behind Dundeel in the Rosehill Guineas before winning the Doncaster Handicap in both 2013 and 2014. His first victory of the 2014–2015 season came in the George Main Stakes.

Stud career
After Sacred Falls retired from racing he stood at Waikato Stud.

Notable progeny

Sacred Falls has currently sired 2 individual Group 1 winners: Icebath and Aegon.

c = colt, f = filly, g = gelding

Sacred Falls died from liver disease at an equine hospital in Matamata on 1 December 2019.

See also

 Thoroughbred racing in New Zealand

References

2009 racehorse births
2019 racehorse deaths
Racehorses bred in New Zealand
Racehorses trained in New Zealand
Racehorses trained in Australia
Thoroughbred family 34